Eshton is a small village and civil parish in the Craven district of North Yorkshire, England. At the 2011 Census the population was less than 100 and is included in the civil parish of Flasby with Winterburn. In 2015, North Yorkshire County Council estimated the population to be 70.

Eshton Hall is a large grade II* listed country house, built in 1825–7 by architect George Webster of Kendal in an Elizabethan revival style for Matthew Wilson. Eston Hall was inherited by Frances Mary Richardson Currer who held a large library.

The hall was converted into apartments between 2003 and 2005.

References

External links

Eshton history pages

Villages in North Yorkshire
Civil parishes in North Yorkshire